Lophiotoma jickelii is a species of sea snail, a marine gastropod mollusk in the family Turridae.

Description
The length of the shell attains 39.4 mm, its diameter 13 mm.

The narrow fusiform shell is multicarinated. Its color is white. The shell is interspersed with quadrangular chestnut spots dotted along the length in undulated lines in revolving series; the spots are on the seam keel. The turreted spire contains 11 convex whorls with five keels and numerous fine stripes in between. The second keel is double in size and becomes the main keel. It protrudes strongly, making the whorls angular and gives them a stair-like appearance. The suture is simple. The aperture is ovate and whitish inside. The columella is straight. The siphonal canal is elongated, only slightly thickened at the beginning. The outer lip is sharp and slightly fissured, with a rather short incision at the anal sinus, ending in the doubled keel.

Distribution
This marine species occurs off Papua New Guinea

References

External links

 Puillandre N., Fedosov A.E., Zaharias P., Aznar-Cormano L. & Kantor Y.I. (2017). A quest for the lost types of Lophiotoma (Gastropoda: Conoidea: Turridae): integrative taxonomy in a nomenclatural mess. Zoological Journal of the Linnean Society. 181: 243-271

jickelii
Gastropods described in 1875